Ahmed Zahur Khan (born 1918) was a Pakistani shot putter and discus thrower who competed in the 1948 Summer Olympics.

See also
 Pakistan at the 1948 Summer Olympics

References

External links
 

1918 births
Possibly living people
Pakistani male discus throwers
Pakistani male shot putters
Olympic athletes of Pakistan
Athletes (track and field) at the 1948 Summer Olympics